The Association de la Sommellerie Internationale is a nonprofit organization founded in  Reims in 1969 to develop and promote the sommelier profession around the world. Every three years since its creation, it holds a competition in an international city and names a person as the best sommelier in the world: the World's Best Sommelier Contest. The ASI will organize the 17th edition of the contest in Paris in 2023.

Meilleur Sommelier du Monde (World's Best Sommelier) 
The World's Best Sommelier Competition has been in existence since 1969.
2023 - Paris - Raimonds Tomsons (Latvia)
2019 - Antwerp - Marc Almert (Germany)
2016 - Mendoza - Jon Arvid Rosengren (Sweden)
2013 - Tokyo - Paolo Basso (Switzerland) 
2010 - Santiago - Gerard Basset (United Kingdom) 
2007 - Rhodes - Andreas Larsson (Sweden) 
2004 - Athens - Enrico Bernardo (Italy)
2000 - Montréal - Olivier Poussier (France) 
1998 - Vienna - Markus del Monego (Germany)
1995 - Tokyo - Shinya Tasaki (Japan) 
1992 - Rio de Janeiro - Philippe Faure-Brac (France) 
1989 - Paris - Serge Dubs (France) 
1986 - Venice - Jean-Claude Jambon (France) 
1983 - Brussels - Jean-Luc Pouteau (France) 
1978 - Lisbon - Giuseppe Vaccarini (Italy)
1971 - Milan - Piero Sattanino (Italy) 
1969 - Brussels - Armand Melkonian (France)

See also
Court of Master Sommeliers
Master of Wine
 Confrérie des Chevaliers du Tastevin
 Wine & Spirit Education Trust

References

External links

Wine tasting
Wine industry organizations
Professional titles and certifications
Organizations established in 1969
1977 establishments in France
Non-profit organizations based in France